Parthenocissus laetevirens is a climbing plant species in the genus Parthenocissus found in China.

Parthenocissus laetevirens contains the stilbene oligomers laetevirenol A, B, C, D and E, the stilbene tetramers laetevirenol F and G as well as  the dimers of resveratrol parthenocissin A, quadrangularin A, pallidol and amurensin A.

References

laetevirens
Plants described in 1912